New Manchester High School is a public high school in the  area of Douglasville, Georgia, United States. It opened its doors in 2011. It is the fifth high school in the Douglas County School District.

Location
New Manchester High School was built on an 80-acre site located on Boundary Waters Parkway in Douglasville on SR 70/SR 92/SR 154/SR 166. The school is located one mile from the Fulton County and Douglas County border, near Boundary Waters Park.

About New Manchester
New Manchester has 102 classrooms, and the school holds 1,975 students. The school mascot is the Jaguar.

The school serves grades 9 through 12.

F.A.M.E Magnet Program 
New Manchester is home of the Fine Arts Magnet Education (FAME) program, which offers concentrations in Dance, Drama, Vocal Music, Instrumental Music, and Visual Art. Because New Manchester was established as the magnet school for fine arts in Douglas County when it opened in 2011, the school has ample resources for the fine arts student, including a fully equipped dance studio, acoustically designed vocal and instrumental music studios, and the largest and most state-of-the art theater in the county.  The rigorous FAME program trains and prepares students for post-secondary collegiate or professional options. FAME has a variety of community partners including: The Alliance Theatre, The Atlanta Ballet Centre for Dance Education, and Kenny Leon's True Colors Theatre. In addition to a faculty of seven full-time teaching artists, FAME engages a host of adjunct teaching artists in the field of sound design, lighting design, dance, instrumental music, and vocal pedagogy. FAME's nationally recognized a cappella group InToneNation has won numerous vocal competitions in recent years.

Administration 
The Douglas County Board of Education named Constance Craft the school's inaugural principal. She was the principal of Douglas County High School from 2006 to 2011, and was its assistant principal from 2002 to 2006. At Robert S. Alexander High School, Craft was an administrative assistant from 2001–2002 and an English language arts teacher from 1999–2001. Craft retired in 2016.

Fhonda Strong was named assistant principal at New Manchester High School at the January 4, 2011 Douglas County Board of Education meeting. A 14-year employee, Strong has been a Math Instructional Coach for the district since 2009.

Shawn Bissell was named assistant principal and athletic director at New Manchester High School at the January 18, 2011 Douglas County Board of Education meeting. A twelve-year veteran of the Douglas County School System and Alexander High School, Bissell has been a Credit Recovery/Coordinated Career Academic Teacher at the school since 2006. Prior to his current position he was a science teacher at Alexander. His coaching experience includes Girls' Soccer Varsity Coach, 2000–present; Assistant Football Coach, 1999–present; Assistant Basketball Coach, 1999–2003, 2005; and Girls' Soccer Assistant Coach, 1999–2000.

References

External links 
 New Manchester High School
 Great School Review

Public high schools in Georgia (U.S. state)
Schools in Douglas County, Georgia